Satyabrata Mookherjee (8 May 1932 – 3 March 2023) was an Indian Union minister of state and the president of BJP's West Bengal state unit from 2008 before being replaced by Rahul Sinha in October 2009. He was minister of state for Chemicals and Fertilizers (September 2000 – June 2002) and later for Commerce and Industry (July 2002 – October 2003) in Atal Bihari Vajpayee ministry.

Career 
Mookherjee was born on 8 May 1932 in Sylhet in Assam (now Bangladesh), he was educated at Calcutta University. He did his Bar-at-law from The Honourable Society of Lincoln's Inn and also pursued further studies at the Regent Street Polytechnic in London.

Mookherjee being a Senior Advocate, was an additional solicitor general of India before being elected, in 1999, to the 13th Lok Sabha from Krishnagar (Lok Sabha constituency) in West Bengal as a candidate of Bharatiya Janata Party.

Personal life and death 
Mookherjee was the nephew of Sankar Das Banerji, Speaker of West Bengal.

Mookherjee died on 3 March 2023, at age 90 in Kolkata.

References 

1932 births
2023 deaths
Indian barristers
20th-century Indian lawyers
People from Sylhet District
University of Calcutta alumni
India MPs 1999–2004
Lok Sabha members from West Bengal
National Democratic Alliance candidates in the 2014 Indian general election
Bharatiya Janata Party politicians from West Bengal
People from Nadia district
Members of Lincoln's Inn
Senior Advocates in India